This is a list of number-one singles in the United States during the year 1949 according to The Billboard. In 1949, the following three singles charts were published weekly ranking the most popular singles:

Best Sellers in Stores – ranked the biggest selling singles in retail stores, as reported by merchants surveyed throughout the country.
Most Played by Jockeys – ranked the most played songs on United States radio stations, as reported by radio disc jockeys and radio stations.
Most Played in Jukeboxes – ranked the most played songs in jukeboxes across the United States.

Shown is a list of songs that topped the Best Sellers in Stores chart.

See also
1949 in music

1949
1949 record charts
1949 in American music